Timothy Watkins, better known by his stage name Baron, is a Trinidadian singer and songwriter. He is known for many soca/calypso songs from the 80s, such as "Sweet Soca Man", "Doh Rock It So" and "Melosian Rhapsody" as well as the 2009 hit "Spanish Woman".

Music career

1971 - 1980: Career beginnings
In 1971, Baron began making calypsoes.

He released the album "Breakdown Time" in 1979, as his debut.

1984–1989: Instant Joy, Sweeter Than Ever, Full of Fire and Melosian Rhapsody

Baron released four albums in this space of time. Singles like "Doh Rock It So", "Buss Up Shut", "Raja Rani", "Soca Espanol" and "Melosian Rhapsody' were soca hits.

1990–94: On Top Of The World and Soca Uprising

He released the albums ''On Top Of The World" and "Soca Uprising".

In 1990, the song "Sweet Soca Man" was released, and was a hit.

1994-98: Ballads With A Caribbean Flavor and more

In 1995, Baron released his album "Ballads With A Caribbean Flavor", one of his longest albums to be released and was a success. The album had a somewhat 'Lovers Rock' feel to it, with its usual soca calypso influences that Baron uses.

1999-2001: The Very Best Of Baron

In 1999, Baron released a compilation album "the very best of baron".

2001-2009: Two Thousand And One

Baron released his album "Two Thousand And One".

2009-16: Christmas With Baron

The Christmas album released by Baron in 2009 is one of his most successful albums. The album spawned the  hit "Spanish Woman" and helped the artist make a comeback.

2016-present: Granny Could Wine and more

In 2016, Baron featured on a track with Granny, a comedian, for her song "Granny Could Wine".

References

1948 births
Trinidad and Tobago singer-songwriters
Living people
20th-century Trinidad and Tobago male singers
20th-century Trinidad and Tobago singers
21st-century Trinidad and Tobago male singers
21st-century Trinidad and Tobago singers